The Diocese of Lapua is one of nine dioceses within the Evangelical Lutheran Church of Finland. The diocese was founded in 1956.

The diocese attained national attention in September 2015, when Finnish media reported that the diocese had purchased a luxury penthouse apartment for the bishop's official residence. Due to the controversy, hundreds of Finns resigned from the church during the days following the media exposure.

Bishops of Lapua
Eero Lehtinen 1956–1974
Yrjö Sariola 1974–1995
Jorma Laulaja 1995–2004
Simo Peura 2004–2022
Matti Salomäki 2022–

See also
Evangelical Lutheran Church of Finland

References

Lapua
Lutheran districts established in the 20th century
Lapua